Svatý Jan nad Malší is a municipality and village in České Budějovice District in the South Bohemian Region of the Czech Republic. It has about 600 inhabitants.

Administrative parts
Villages of Chlum and Sedlce are administrative parts of Svatý Jan nad Malší.

Twin towns – sister cities

Svatý Jan nad Malší is twinned with:
 Grünbach, Austria

References

Villages in České Budějovice District